Golujeh (also Romanized as Golūjeh and Gollūjeh; also known as Kollūjeh, Kuluja, and Kyulyudzha) is a village in Khanandabil-e Gharbi Rural District, in the Central District of Khalkhal County, Ardabil Province, Iran. At the 2006 census, its population was 225, in 52 families.

References 

Towns and villages in Khalkhal County